Amir Perets (born 20 September 1974 in Tiberias, Israel) is an Israeli-born mixed martial artist, entrepreneur, and active participant in Fight Science featured on the National Geographic Channel. He is an instrumental figure in popularizing the self-defense system of the Israeli Defense Forces known as Krav Maga.

Career 
At age 18, Amir Perets received awards of distinction for physical education and sports and became Israel's heavyweight full-contact martial arts champion. He then joined the IDF. Perets later became the IDF Krav Maga/hand-to-hand combat instructor for the Israeli infantry and Special Forces units.

Excelling as an instructor, Perets was assigned to the top level of Krav Maga instruction in the IDF, certifying the hand-to-hand combat instructor course; having taught some of the IDF top instructors, Perets then was selected for the Shayetet 13 IDF elite naval commando unit where he built the unit's hand-to-hand combat program.

After completing his military service, Perets traveled to Thailand to continue to pursue his interest in mixed martial arts by training in Muay Thai (Thai boxing). 

Perets then emigrated to the United States and pursued teaching defensive tactics and life-saving methods to military counter-terror units, law enforcement agencies and civilians worldwide. Simultaneously, he became a lead instructor at the newly formed “Krav Maga National Training Center" in Los Angeles, California, where he holds a sixth degree black belt.

Motion Capture 

Perets was used as Niko Bellic for the video game "Grand Theft Auto IV" and did motion capture for the main character's fighting moves along with Bas Rutten.

Hall of Fame 

In 2009 Amir Perets was inducted into the Martial Arts Masters Hall of Fame for his outstanding contributions to law enforcement, military and the world of martial arts.

The Masters Hall of Fame is an association of Martial Artists and other interested parties that works to recognize, develop, enhance and improve the Martial Arts Leaders and Businesses by “Developing and Recognizing Excellence” in the Martial Arts Communities.

Filmography 
The Accountant .... Mercenary team leader Warrior .... Yosi
Drillbit Taylor (2008) .... "Mossad" Agent aka "Drillbit Taylor: Budget Bodyguard" - USA (poster title)
Never Back Down (2008) (Technical Advisor)
Psychotic (2002) .... Juice

 TV / Miscellaneous 

 Car Science (2011)
 "Bust a Move" (2011) TV episode .... Himself
 Inside MMA (2007–2010)
 Episode dated 5 March 2010 (2010) TV episode .... Himself
 Episode #1.14 (2007) TV episode .... HimselfFight Science (2008–2010)
 "Human Weapon" (2010) TV episode .... Himself
 "Fighting Back" (2008) TV episode .... Himself
 Fight Science'' (2007) (TV) .... Himself

Sources

External links 
 Fight Science featuring Amir Perets on KravMaga.com
 MA Success Magazine Article about Amir Perets
 Black Belt magazine featuring Amir Perets
 Amir Perets – Martial Arts Champion, Fitness Guru, Israeli Self-Defense Expert
 Inside MMA 410: Cain Velasquez, Vladimir Matyushenko and Amir Perets
 Martial Arts Masters Hall of Fame

1974 births
Living people
Israeli male mixed martial artists
Mixed martial artists utilizing Krav Maga
Mixed martial artists utilizing Kyokushin kaikan
Mixed martial artists utilizing Muay Thai
Israeli Muay Thai practitioners
Israeli male karateka
People from Tiberias